El Camino Fundamental High School is a public high school in Arden-Arcade, California, near Sacramento. It is part of the San Juan Unified School District.  Built in 1951 as El Camino High School, "Fundamental" was added to the name in the late 1970s to signify the school's intention to focus upon basic (fundamental) characteristics of successful schools, in particular a return to a strong disciplinary emphasis, a stripped-down college preparatory curriculum, and a contract-supported, enroll-through-application-only process.

Academically, as measured by their Academic Performance Index, El Camino finally broke the important "800" barrier in 2009 after two years of changes implemented by its former principal, Mike Stockdale. El Camino has continually met the requirements of the Adequate Yearly Progress (AYP) outlined under No Child Left Behind mandates, since their inception.

El Camino has, for over 20 years, participated with the state's "California Partnership Academy" program through the Eagle Polytechnic Institute (EPI) which focuses on engineering and manufacturing.

Curriculum
The school offers Advanced Placement courses in Chemistry, English, Government, Psychology, Biology, Environmental Science, Calculus, Statistics, Spanish, and History. They had AP courses in French and Physics before, then it was deleted.

El Camino Band
El Camino Fundamental High School has four academic bands and one Pep Band. All four bands are under the leadership of Band Director Kevin Glaser, who has been teaching at the school since 1994, was a News 10 KXTV Teacher of the Month in 2007, and has made the EC (El Camino) band program what it is today.

El Camino Choir
Choral Director David Vanderbout, a 2005 graduate of El Camino High School, has led the school's choirs since 2012. He leads a beginning choir, and intermediate choir, and an advanced Jazz choir.

El Camino Theatre
El Camino Fundamental High School offers two theatrical classes, Beginning, and Advanced Drama. The program has also put on 3 productions every year while offering students the option of being a part of the cast or crew. For the past 5 years, the program has been run under the supervision of Edward Santillanes, who recently retired at the end of the 2018 school year. Under Mr. Santiallnes' direction the El Camino Drama department has put on multiple successful shows and musicals, recently including, Fiddler on the Roof (2016), Blythe Spirit (2016), The Sound of Music (2017), Plaza Suite (2017), Nice Work If You Can Get It (2018), Suite Surrender (2018), and The Wizard of Oz (2019). In recent years the program has received multiple awards from the San Juan Theatre Festival, including Gold and Bronze in an Original Scene, (2017), Bronze in Female Monologue (2017), Silver in an Original Scene (2018) and Gold in a Female Monologue (2018). Through his dedication and love for the performing arts and for his students, Mr. Santiallnes has made El Camino's Theatre Program one of the best in the district. The program is currently ran by Mr. Christopher Travlos, renowned by students for being the best theatre teacher to ever have graced the school.

EPI (Eagle Polytechnic Institute)
The EPI program is for 10th-12th students who wish to have a different high school experience. EPI is a California Partnership Academy that runs as a School within a School format. EPI students share 2-4 classes with each other every year. These classes strive to feature cross-curricular core content and activities focused around manufacturing and engineering. Students of the academy take three tech classes: Pre-engineering Technology 1,2, and 3. In Tech , the students learn the basics of metalworking, CADD, electronics, applied physics, welding, and various other manufacturing processes. Tech 2 builds on engineering design elements taught in Tech 1 and emphasize CADD, prototyping, and 3D printing. Tech 3 is the capstone course that trains students on metalwork including various forms of welding, casting, and manufacturing of Physic class based machines (2018 = Pinball machines).

Aside from technical skills, the EPI students will take academic field trips to active construction sites, Intel, the Folsom Forge, various colleges (CSU Sacramento, ARC, Sierra College, St. Mary's, CSU Chico, Universal Technical Institute, and more).  The field trips often include visits to engineering and manufacturing marvels that tie into the core content being discussed in their history and English courses, making the information concrete (Examples: taking a transit with the Hawaiian Chieftain around San Francisco Bay, the Bay Model in Sebastapool) As well as, get the opportunity to hear from, and interact with members of the Engineering and Manufacturing industry sector through EPI's business partners (2018 partners - Trico Tools, McCarthy Construction, Intel).

Every year EPI hosts its own showcase of student skills during Tech Night. This 2 hour celebration/competition of students include the testing of student bridges, and physics machines, while giving prospective students a chance to meet instructors, see the facilities, and get a chance to talk with current students about the program.

EPI, and all California Partnership Academies, are built like families, and are designed to help at risk students to graduate. The students build near sibling level relationships between themselves, while the small group of EPI teachers do their best to make sure every student succeeds. EPI is proud that our family style set up has been able to maintain a 95% graduation rate of our students for over 20 years.

EPI is accepts incoming 10th and 11th grade students by application. If you are interested in joining, contact the academy for more information. Schedule sign ups happen in late February and early March, so be looking out EPI ads around the campus and on the website.

Academic Decathlon 
El Camino won the Sacramento County Academic Decathlon back-to-back in 1984 and 1985.  The 1989 and 1990 year teams are widely regarded as the best El Camino ever fielded.

Sports 
Several El Camino Fundamental High School's sports teams at one point were ranked nationally including the El Camino E-gals dance/drill team who won the UNITED Spirit association's national competition in the dance/drill category in 2004. The school competes in the Capital Athletic League.

Principals
Randy Holcomb, formerly the principal of Foothill Ranch Middle School in Sacramento, CA is the current principal of the school. Shelley Friery, formerly a vice principal of the school, served as principal until 2017, having served since 2013. Jill Spears, formerly a vice principal at the school, was the principal until 2013, having served since 2010. Michael Stockdale, formerly a vice principal at Woodcreek High School in Roseville, CA was the principal from 2007-2010. Ernest Boone, formerly the principal at River City High School in West Sacramento, CA and Vacaville High School in Vacaville, CA was the principal of El Camino from 1993-2007.

Notable alumni 

 Andy Allo – Singer and songwriter
 Mike Burton - Olympic gold medalist swimmer
 Jessica Chastain – Academy-Award-winning actress (dropped out)
 Claude "Butch" Lee Edge – Former MLB pitcher
 Mandisa Hundley – Singer
 Laura Ingle – Correspondent for Fox News Channel
 Phil Isenberg – State Assemblyman and former Sacramento Mayor
 Christina Kahrl – Co-founder of Baseball Prospectus, editor for ESPN.com, and member of the Baseball Writers' Association of America
 Victor Kim – former member of Quest Crew, winners of MTV's 3rd season of America's Best Dance Crew
 Derrek Lee (1993) – Former MLB first baseman
 Kate Levering – Actress
 Michael Faulkender – Professor of finance at the Robert H. Smith School of Business at the University of Maryland and former Assistant Secretary of the Treasury for Economic Policy.
 Ronald McDonald - Sports legend and adult film actor 
 Larry Linville – Major Frank Burns in the television series M*A*S*H
  Malati Dasi (Melanie Lee Nagel) – First international female leader of the Hare Krishna movement

References

External links
 
 The El Camino Band website

High schools in Sacramento, California
Public high schools in California
1951 establishments in California